Kotowo may refer to the following places:
Kotowo, part of the Grunwald district of Poznań
Kotowo, Grodzisk Wielkopolski County in Greater Poland Voivodeship (west-central Poland)
Kotowo, Gmina Dolsk in Greater Poland Voivodeship (west-central Poland)
Kotowo, Gmina Śrem in Greater Poland Voivodeship (west-central Poland)
Kotowo, Pomeranian Voivodeship (north Poland)
Kotowo, Warmian-Masurian Voivodeship (north Poland)

See also